HMS Salisbury was a 50-gun fourth-rate ship of the line of the Royal Navy.

Service 
The Salisbury was built at Chatham Dockyard by Joseph Harris to the design of Sir Thomas Slade, and launched on 2 October 1769. She participated in Admiral Edward Hawke's Western Squadron in the Mediterranean, and undertook several voyages to the West Indies.

Fate 
The Salisbury was grounded on 13 May 1796 near Santo Domingo and surrendered to the Spanish.

References 

Ships of the line of the Royal Navy
1769 ships